The Ballad Collection is a 2000 compilation of ballads recorded by R&B group Boyz II Men, released by Universal Records. It includes both hit singles and album tracks.

Track listing
"On Bended Knee"
"Doin' Just Fine"
"Please Don't Go"
"End of the Road"
"It's So Hard to Say Goodbye to Yesterday"
"Can You Stand the Rain"
"Girl in the Life Magazine"
"One Sweet Day" (with Mariah Carey)
"Four Seasons of Loneliness"
"Water Runs Dry"
"A Song for Mama"
"I'll Make Love to You"
"Your Home Is in My Heart" (featuring Chante Moore)
"I Will Get There"
"Yesterday" [Spanish Version]
"End of the Road" [instrumental]
"So Amazing"

Certifications

References

Boyz II Men compilation albums
2000 compilation albums
Universal Records albums
Albums produced by Tim & Bob